Pholidoscelis alboguttatus, the Mona ground lizard or Mona ameiva, is a member of the Teiidae family of lizards. It is endemic to Isla Mona in Puerto Rico.

References

Pholidoscelis
Reptiles of Puerto Rico
Endemic fauna of Puerto Rico
Reptiles described in 1896
Taxa named by George Albert Boulenger